Mona Elaine Adilman (1924 – 1991) was a Jewish-Canadian poet living in Montreal, Quebec. She received her B.A. from McGill University in 1945. Adilman was committed to social and environmental causes, warning Quebecers against the dangers of pesticides, creating and teaching a course on Ecology and Literature at Concordia University, directing a Heritage Group called Save Montreal, and editing an anthology of writings from prison called Spirits of the Age: Poets of Conscience.

Adilman was married to Dr. Morris Solomon, and they had one daughter, Shelley Solomon. Her daughter established the Mona Elaine Adilman Lectureship on the Environment in her mother's memory.

A scholarship called the Mona Elaine Adilman Poetry Prize was established in 1992 by a bequest from Adilman in the Department of English at McGill University. The Association for Canadian Jewish Studies awards annually the Mona Elaine Adilman English Fiction and Poetry Award on a Jewish Theme as one of the J.I. Segal Awards.

Publications

Poetry

Candles in the Dark. Oakville: Mosaic Press, 1990.
Nighty-Knight. Ken Hanly ed. Dollarpoems, Series 3, no. 1, 1986
Piece Work. Ottawa: Borealis Press, 1980.
Cult of Concrete. Montreal: Editions Bonsecours Editions, 1977.
Best of Wings: An Environmental Story. New York: Regency Press, 1972.

Edited
Spirits of the Age: Poets of Conscience. Mona Adilman, ed. Kingston: Quarry Press, 1989.

References

1924 births
1991 deaths
Activists from Montreal
Anglophone Quebec people
Canadian women activists
Canadian women poets
Academic staff of Concordia University
Jewish Canadian writers
Jewish Canadian activists
McGill University alumni
Writers from Montreal
20th-century Canadian poets
20th-century Canadian women writers